Zhou Zhonghe (born 19 January 1965 in Jiangdu, Jiangsu province) is a Chinese palaeontologist. He described the ancient bird Confuciusornis.

Zhou graduated from Nanjing University and earned a Ph.D. in Biology in 1999 from the University of Kansas. He is the director of the Institute of Vertebrate Paleontology and Paleoanthropology of the Chinese Academy of Sciences in Beijing, and in 2010 was elected to the U.S. National Academy of Sciences.

References

1965 births
Living people
Biologists from Jiangsu
Chinese paleontologists
Foreign associates of the National Academy of Sciences
Members of the Chinese Academy of Sciences
Nanjing University alumni
Paleontology in Jiangsu
Scientists from Yangzhou
 
University of Kansas alumni